Darryl Neudorf (born June 7, 1964 in Saskatoon, Saskatchewan) is a Canadian musician, record producer and audio engineer.

He was the drummer for 54-40 from 1982 to 1986.  He is best known during this time for co-writing the hit song "I Go Blind", a Canadian hit which was later covered by U.S. rock group Hootie and the Blowfish.

He has also worked as a producer for a number of other recording artists, including Sarah McLachlan, Neko Case, The New Pornographers, Kevin Kane, Kinnie Starr, Twilight Circus Dub Sound System, Dead Voices on Air, Justin Rutledge, Jim Bryson, Jim Cuddy, Bob Egan, The Sadies, and Blue Rodeo.

Neudorf continues to produce music at his residential recording studio, located about an hour north of Toronto, Ontario. His studio is called Operation Northwoods and is located in The Hills of Headwaters.

Biography

Early life
Darryl Neudorf grew up in Kelowna, British Columbia, where his parents bought him a drum kit for Christmas when he was ten years old.

Throughout his teens Neudorf picked fruit in orchards, worked at The Pop Shop, skateboarded around Kelowna and formed the band Empty Set with his sister Adele Neudorf, Kevin Kane and Jon Brotherton.

54-40
At 18, Darryl Neudorf joined the band 54-40 as their drummer. They recorded two albums, toured extensively in North America and at the time of his departure, 54-40 had signed a deal with Warner/Reprise. The songs that Neudorf performed, co-composed and produced with 54-40 helped to catapult their career, achieving gold and platinum status in Canada. In 1986, after four years in the band, Neudorf left 54-40 to pursue a career in music production.

Recording work
In 1987, Darryl Neudorf was asked to work on a project for Nettwerk Productions involving a newly signed artist in their repertoire named Sarah McLachlan. This recording, the album Touch, resulted in garnering the interest of Arista Records.  She signed a multi-album contract with them and two of the songs that Neudorf worked on with her became commercial hits in Canada. In 1991, Neudorf was invited back to work with McLachlan on her second album, Solace.

In 1993, he filed a lawsuit against McLachlan and her label, Nettwerk, alleging that he had made a significant and uncredited contribution to the songwriting on Touch, and alleging that he wasn't paid properly for work done on Solace. The judge in this suit eventually ruled in McLachlan's favour on the songs; though Neudorf may have contributed to the songwriting, neither regarded each other as joint authors. The judge ruled in Neudorf's favour on the payment issue.

Miller Block
In 1994, in Vancouver's Downtown Eastside, Darryl Neudorf and Tracy Pillsworth met with Tom Anselmi of the band Copyright. The three met on the top floor of a building that was built in 1948 through Jim Carrico who had found the Hastings Street space for lease. An artists' co-operative was about to burgeon and become home to a group of people generating dozens of CDs and vinyl representing Vancouver's eclectic underground. Neudorf and Pillsworth lent Anselmi their recording equipment to record what was to become Copyright's second CD, Love Story. The building of a recording studio that was soundproofed and secure followed.  The studio was named after the arched words painted in gold on the front of the building's black and green tiled facade; Miller Block was born.

Throughout the 1990s, Neudorf designed, managed, owned and operated Miller Block with Tracy Pillsworth (aka Sugarpill), where he did much of his recording and production.  This work resulted in scores of releases in a wide variety of genres from underground rock to roots rock to country to avant-garde electronica.  Among others, this list includes Cub, Duotang, Neko Case, Kinnie Starr, Herald Nix, The New Pornographers, Superconductor, Kevin Kane, I Am Spoonbender, Twilight Circus Dub Sound System, Faust and Dead Voices on Air.  The merging of equipment, space and trust surrounding Miller Block resulted in a creative studio environment that flourished for six years, until the Fall of 2000.

Relocation
In 2001, Darryl Neudorf, Tracy Pillsworth and the boxed up studio moved to Toronto, Ontario. Once in Toronto, Neudorf continued to produce and engineer successful recordings, among others, Americana singer Neko Case.

The Audio Recording Academy
During 2002 Darryl Neudorf was asked by Shannon Murray to become the head instructor at, and design the curriculum for, a new audio production school located in downtown Toronto called The Audio Recording Academy. Neudorf remained head teacher until 2008 when during an indefinite leave, producer / engineer Damon de Szegheo took over head instructor duties.

Operation Northwoods Recording Services
In November 2004, after looking for a resort-styled location to set up a recording studio, Darryl Neudorf and Tracy Pillsworth found a creative retreat.

The studio is called Operation Northwoods Recording Services where musicians have produced recordings with Neudorf at the helm, with him either producing, mixing, engineering, drumming and mastering. Among others, these musicians include The Sadies, Jim Cuddy, Justin Rutledge, Bob Egan, The Mohawk Lodge, Jim Bryson, Neko Case, Two Hours Traffic, The Grapes of Wrath, Brementown Players, Robyn Cage, Lily Frost and Lost Cousins.

Neudorf continues to produce music amidst the Oak Ridges Moraine, along the shores of one of South-central Ontario's kettle lakes, just north of Toronto, Ontario.

References

External links
 Official website

1964 births
Living people
Musicians from Kelowna
Musicians from Saskatoon
Musicians from Vancouver
Canadian rock musicians
Canadian record producers
Canadian songwriters
Writers from Saskatoon
Writers from Vancouver